Cobbs Hill is a rural locality in the South Burnett Region, Queensland, Australia.

References 

South Burnett Region
Localities in Queensland